Birkweiler is a municipality in the Südliche Weinstraße district, in Rhineland-Palatinate, Germany.

Location 
The municipality is a typical wine village on the German Wine Route in the  Siebelding valley at the foot of the Hohenberg (556 m with an observation tower).

References

Municipalities in Rhineland-Palatinate
Südliche Weinstraße